True That is the debut album by Canadian actor and musician Michael Cera. It was self-released on 8 August 2014, via Bandcamp, and recorded and mixed by Cera.

Reception

The album has garnered positive reviews from music critics, with many comparing it to the work of Elliott Smith and other indie folk artists. However, some critics have expressed reservations about the album's length across 21 tracks. Amy Zimmerman of The Daily Beast gave the album a positive review, stating "a mix of instrumental tracks, lovely ballads and solemn covers, true that is music to make sweet, sweet love to... The sound is all melancholy, alternative, and adorable". On the other hand, Zimmerman felt that the album seemed "almost infinite" due to its full length of over 50 minutes. Vulture.com's Jesse David Fox cited the album's "pleasant instrumentals"; he compared the overall effect to the works of Cass McCombs, Jason Schwartzman's band Coconut Records, and Elliott Smith, as well as Paul and Linda McCartney's first album, Ram. 7BitArcade's Aaron Kent praised Cera's "wistful vocals", describing them "a broken Elliott Smith trying to channel Beck". Chris DeVille of Stereogum called true that "a charming listen", adding that "[i]ts lo-fi folk songs and jazzy piano ditties remind me—in spirit, at least—of Badly Drawn Boy’s threadbare debut The Hour of Bewilderbeast".

Ryan Reed of Rolling Stone chose "Too Much", "2048" and "Clay Pigeons" as three of the album's highlights.

Track listing

Personnel
Michael Cera – acoustic and electric guitars, piano, vocals, bass, keyboards, drums, percussion, production, engineering, mixing

References

External links
true that on Bandcamp

2014 debut albums
Michael Cera albums
Self-released albums